Pakistan Industrial Credit and Investment Corporation (PICIC) is a financial institution in Pakistan, one of the first development finance institutions established with the World Bank Group assistance in 1957. In 2007, PICIC Commercial Bank was bought by Singapore owned NIB Bank.

History
PICIC Insurance Limited is a part of the Temasek Holdings. NIB Bank Limited, a Temasek's subsidiary in Pakistan, is a major shareholder of PICIC Insurance Limited with a 30% stake. Temasek Holdings is an investment company owned by the government of Singapore, through which is managed a portfolio of more than US$100 billion, focused primarily in Asia.

Leaders of PICIC Insurance Ltd announced in 2016 that Sakib Berjees along with a consortium of investors is in the process of establishing a special purpose vehicle (SPV) to be named Sakib Berjees & Consortium (Private) Limited for the acquisition of 30% stake in the company from NIB Bank Ltd which currently holds 30% stake only in the company.

References

Investment management companies of Pakistan
Financial services companies established in 1957
Pakistani companies established in 1957